Jim Madigan (born August 5, 1962) is the current Athletic Director for Northeastern University. He was previously the head coach of the men's ice hockey team for 10 seasons.  Madigan was also a player for the Huskies from 1981 to 1985.

Career at Northeastern
1981–85 Northeastern University Player
1986–93 Northeastern University Assistant Coach
1993–99 Northeastern University Assistant Director of Physical Plant Services
1999–04 Northeastern University Director of Athletic Development
2004–11 Northeastern University Associate Dean and Director of Development of the College of Business Administration
2011–21 Northeastern University Head Coach
2021–Present Northeastern University Athletic Director

Head coaching record

References

External links
 Official Biography, Northeastern Huskies

1962 births
Living people
Anglophone Quebec people
New York Islanders scouts
Northeastern Huskies men's ice hockey coaches
Northeastern Huskies men's ice hockey players
Vermont Catamounts men's ice hockey coaches
Pittsburgh Penguins scouts
Ice hockey people from Montreal